is a Japanese fashion model and a newly launched J-pop singer. Her singing style was compared by Oricon to Pink's.

Born December 12, 1986 in Nagoya, she is under the Tokyo-based LesPros Entertainment.

She first became a model in 2000, when she was 13 years old.  She is the lead singer of Learners, a Japanese rock band specializing in British and American oldies.

Early life 
Born in Nagoya, Aichi Prefecture, Japan on December 12, 1986 to an American father and a Japanese mother.

Performances

TV 
 ロンブー淳の惚れさせシェフ (2009.9.2, Asahi Broadcasting Corporation)

Film 
 Smokin' on the Moon (2018)
 Niwatori Phoenix (2022)

Discography 
 Cherry/Gossip (2010.4.7, Avex Trax, produced by Jeff Miyahara)
 Learners / "Learners" (2017)
 Learners / "More Learners" (2018)
 Learners / "Learners High" (2019)
 Learners / "Hello, Stranger" (2020)

Commercials 
 Kao Corporation
 近鉄パッセ
 Studio Alta

Magazine Covers 
 Vivi
 Nicola
 Cutie
 Zipper
 So-En
 Non-no
 Jille
 An-an
 Olive
 Seda
 Keda
 Pretty Style
 Street Jack
 Mini
 Hot Dog Press
 Vita
 Mina

Stage Appearances 
 Tokyo Girls Collection
 EARTH MUSIC & ECOLOGY
 CANDY STRIPPER
 Do! Family
 KOSUKE TSUMURA「Niyabru」
 宝島社合同ファッションショー（台湾）
 La FORET COLLECTION NIIGATA

References

External links 
 Sara Mary's HP by Avex Trax
 Sara Mary on LesPros Entertainment
 Sara Mary on Ameblo

1986 births
Japanese female models
Japanese women pop singers
Avex Group artists
People from Nagoya
Living people
Japanese people of American descent
Musicians from Aichi Prefecture
21st-century Japanese singers
21st-century Japanese women singers